Quincy Jones Explores the Music of Henry Mancini is an album by Quincy Jones that contains music composed by Henry Mancini.

Track listing
All music composed by Henry Mancini, lyricists indicated

 "Baby Elephant Walk" – 2:49
 "Charade" (Johnny Mercer) – 3:15
 "Dreamsville" (Ray Evans, Jay Livingston) – 3:48
 "Bird Brain" – 4:06
 "Days of Wine and Roses" (Mercer) – 2:42
 "Mr. Lucky" – 2:24
 "The Pink Panther Theme" – 3:35
 "(I Love You and) Don't You Forget It" (Al Stillman) – 2:51
 "Soldier in the Rain" – 3:09
 "Odd Ball" – 3:43
 "Moon River" (Mercer) – 2:31
 "The Theme from Peter Gunn" – 2:52

Personnel
 
 Quincy Jones – arranger, conductor
 John Bello – trumpet
 Jimmy Maxwell – trumpet
 Ernie Royal – trumpet
 Clark Terry – trumpet
 Snooky Young – trumpet
 Billy Byers – trombone
 Urbie Green – trombone
 Richard Hixson – trombone
 Quentin Jackson – trombone
 Tony Studd – trombone
 George Berg – saxophone
 Walter Kane – saxophone
 Rahsaan Roland Kirk – saxophone, flute
 Romeo Penque – saxophone
 Seldon Powell – saxophone
 Jerome Richardson – saxophone
 Stanley Webb – saxophone
 Phil Woods – saxophone
 Zoot Sims – saxophone
 Ray Alonge – French horn
 James Buffington – French horn
 Tony Miranda – French horn
 Bob Northern – French horn
 Toots Thielemans – guitar, harmonica, whistle
 Vinnie Bell – guitar
 Mundell Lowe – guitar
 Margaret Ross – harp
 Gary Burton – vibraphone
 Bobby Scott – piano
 Major Holley – double bass
 Milt Hinton – double bass
 Philip Kraus – percussion
 Martin Grupp – percussion
 Osie Johnson – drums

References

1964 albums
Albums arranged by Quincy Jones
Albums conducted by Quincy Jones
Albums produced by Quincy Jones
Henry Mancini tribute albums
Instrumental albums
Mercury Records albums
Quincy Jones albums